Crematogaster cornigera is a species of ant in tribe Crematogastrini. It was described by Forel in 1902.

References

cornigera
Insects described in 1902